Gibeauxiella reliqua is a moth in the family Cosmopterigidae. It is found in France and Madagascar. It was described from the Fontainebleau forest. The only known specimen was caught at the beginning of May on a fallen trunk of Fagus sylvatica.

References

Moths described in 1986
Antequerinae
Moths of Europe